Charles "Duke" Greco (born c. 1978) is an American college football coach and former player. He is the head football coach at Delaware Valley University in Doylestown, Pennsylvania, a position he has held since the 2014 season. Greco played college football at Delaware Valley, first as a defensive back and then as a quarterback. He threw for 3,974 yards and 45 touchdowns during his career as a player at Delaware Valley. Greco served as assistant head coach and offensive coordinator for the Aggies for eights years, from 2006 to 2013, under Jim Clements before succeeding him as head coach when Clements left to become the head football coach at Kutztown University of Pennsylvania.

Greco attended Lower Moreland High School in Huntingdon Valley, Pennsylvania, where he played football as a quarterback under head coach Mark Mayson.

Head coaching record

References

External links
 Delaware Valley profile

1970s births
Year of birth missing (living people)
Living people
American football quarterbacks
Delaware Valley Aggies football coaches
Delaware Valley Aggies football players
Sportspeople from Montgomery County, Pennsylvania
Coaches of American football from Pennsylvania
Players of American football from Pennsylvania